Mordellistena mediana is a species of beetle in the family Mordellidae which is in the superfamily Tenebrionoidea. It was discovered in 1977 and can be found in Croatia, Greece and Hungary.

References

mediana
Beetles described in 1977
Beetles of Europe